Fluviopupa gracilis is a species of very small freshwater snails that have an operculum, aquatic gastropod mollusks in the family Tateidae.

Distribution
This species is endemic to Australia.

References

Gastropods of Australia
gracilis
Gastropods described in 1944
Taxonomy articles created by Polbot